The men's tournament of water polo at the 2011 Summer Universiade at Shenzhen, China began on August 11 and ended on August 23.

Teams

Preliminary round

Group A

Group B

Group C

Group D

Eightfinals

Quarterfinal Round

Classification 9–14 places

Quarterfinals

Semifinal Round

Classification 5–8 places

Semifinals

Final round

Classification 12–14 places

Classification 9–11 places

Final 7–8 places

Final 5–6 places

Bronze Medal match

Gold Medal match

Final standings

External links
Schedule
Reports

Water polo at the 2011 Summer Universiade